Changthang Skad, also known as Byangskat and Upper Ladakhi, is a dialect of Ladakhi language spoken in a  Changthang region on the border of Tibet and Ladakh. Speakers identify ethnically with the Ladakhi, but mutual intellibility of the languages is not high.  A few speakers can also be found in the Baltistan region of Pakistan.

References

Languages of Ladakh
Bodish languages